"Undeniable" is a song by Norwegian record producer and DJ Kygo, featuring a guest appearance from American rock band X Ambassadors. It was released on 15 October 2021 through RCA Records. Kygo wrote the song with Ethan Snoreck, Jacob Kasher, Nick Long, Patrick Martin and X Ambassadors' lead vocalist Sam Harris, and produced it with Petey Martin. It also marks the first cooperation between both sides.

Background
In a press release, X Ambassadors stated:

Content
Drew Barkin of EDMtunes described the song as "a heartfelt track that will get you thinking about loved ones". The song is written in the key of F♯ major, with a tempo of 108 beats per minute.

Credits and personnel
Credits adapted from Tidal.

 Kygo – producer, composer, lyricist, associated performer
 X Ambassadors – associated performer
 Petey Martin – producer
 Ethan Snoreck – composer, lyricist
 Jacob Kasher – composer, lyricist
 Nick Long – composer, lyricist
 Patrick Martin – composer, lyricist
 Sam Nelson Harris – composer, lyricist
 Bryce Bordone – assistant engineer
 John Hanes – engineer
 Randy Merrill – mastering engineer
 Serban Ghenea – mixing engineer
 Ryan Dulude – recording engineer

Charts

Weekly charts

Year-end charts

References

2021 songs
2021 singles
Kygo songs
X Ambassadors songs
Songs written by Kygo
Song recordings produced by Kygo
RCA Records singles